Rohtee ogilbii, the Vatani rohtee, is a species of cyprinid fish endemic to the northern Western Ghats in southern India.  It is the only species in its genus.

References
 

Cyprinid fish of Asia
Fish of India
Fish described in 1839